Candela Medical Corporation is an American laser company that develops and sells medical lasers for cosmetic use located in Marlborough, Massachusetts.

History
Candela Medical Corporation was founded in 1970.

Innovation and highlights
Candela uses its technology to treat a wider range of cosmetic conditions including the treatment of vascular conditions such as birthmarks, acne and acne scars, minor wrinkles, and hair removal.  This effort is part of a broader campaign to capture a larger market share of the growing cosmetic surgery industry in the United States and abroad.  The company has made an effort to promote laser, IPL, energy-based treatments as an alternative to electrolysis, botox or traditional surgery.

Companies based in Massachusetts